Stick to Me is the third studio album by English singer-songwriter Graham Parker and his first group, the Rumour.

Background
Parker, interviewed by Steve Hammer, recalled the making of the album:

Critical reception

Rolling Stone critic Dave Marsh found that Stick to Me lacks highlights on the level of the best songs from Parker's previous releases and criticized its production, which he said "obscures the songs' drive and power, making murky some of the most lucid music around."

Critical opinion of Stick to Me generally ranks it below their first two albums, Howlin' Wind and Heat Treatment. An undeniable shortcoming is the sound: the sessions suffered from a production mishap. The original recording was ruined, and all the songs needed to be rerecorded hastily. This accounts for the absence of bonus tracks on reissues – there weren't any leftovers.

Track listing
All songs written by Graham Parker except as indicated.
 "Stick to Me" – 3:29
 "I'm Gonna Tear Your Playhouse Down" (Earl Randle) – 3:26
 "Problem Child" – 3:25
 "Soul on Ice" – 3:01
 "Clear Head" – 2:58
 "The New York Shuffle" – 2:58
 "Watch the Moon Come Down" – 4:49
 "Thunder and Rain" – 3:15
 "The Heat in Harlem" – 7:00
 "The Raid" – 2:39

Personnel
Graham Parker – vocals, guitar
Brinsley Schwarz – guitar
Bob Andrews – organ, piano, keyboards, backing vocals
Martin Belmont – guitar, backing vocals
Andrew Bodnar – bass guitar
Steve Goulding – drums, backing vocals

Additional personnel
John Altman – saxophone
Ray Beavis – saxophone
David Bedford – arrangements
John Earle – saxophone
Chris Gower – trombone
Dick Hanson – trumpet
Darryl Leeque – percussion

Charts

References

Graham Parker albums
1977 albums
Albums produced by Nick Lowe
Mercury Records albums
Vertigo Records albums